Thyra Frank (born 10 May 1952) is a Danish nurse and politician.

She was born in Skørping to Jens Kristian Frank and Anna Nystrup Frank, and is married to Peter Camillo Rasmussen. She was elected member of Folketinget for the Liberal Alliance from 2011 to 2015. She was appointed Minister for Elderly Affairs in the Lars Løkke Rasmussen III Cabinet from 28 November 2016 to 27 June 2019.

Frank was decorated Knight of the Order of the Dannebrog in 2008.

References

1952 births
Living people
Danish nurses
People from Rebild Municipality
Government ministers of Denmark
Liberal Alliance (Denmark) politicians
21st-century Danish women politicians
Women government ministers of Denmark
Members of the Folketing 2011–2015
Women members of the Folketing